The Nikon D7100 is a 24.1-megapixel digital single-lens reflex camera model announced by Nikon in February 2013. It is a 'prosumer' model that replaces the Nikon D7000 as Nikon's flagship DX-format camera, fitting between the company's entry-level and professional DSLR models. This camera is the first ever of Nikon, with no optical low-pass filter incorporated. At launch, Nikon gave the D7100 estimated selling price in the United States as US$ 949.95 for the body.

Features
 24.1 effective megapixel CMOS, Nikon DX format image sensor, without an optical low-pass filter
 Nikon EXPEED 3 image-processing engine;
 Advanced Multi-CAM 3500DX autofocus sensor module with 51 focus points;
 3D Color Matrix Metering II 2,016-pixel RGB sensor;
 HD video mode with autofocus. Up to 1080p at 24p, 25p and 50i (50i true interlaced: based on 50 sensor readouts per second), 30p and 60i (60i true interlaced), 720p at 50p or 60p frames per second (fps). H.264/MPEG-4 AVC Expeed video processor. HDMI out with support of uncompressed video (clean HDMI)
 ISO sensitivity 100 to 6400 (up to 25600 with boost);
 3.2-inch, TFT LCD monitor with 1,228,800-dot resolution (RGBW alignment);
 Central cross-type focus points support autofocusing with lenses with a maximum aperture of f/5.6;
 Center cross-type focus point supports autofocusing with lenses with a maximum aperture of f/8;
 DX-sized sensor with 1.5x crop factor; (additional 1.3x crop mode available)
 Viewfinder with approximately 100% frame coverage and 0.94x magnification ratio;
 GPS interface for direct geotagging supported by Nikon GP-1.

Video performance
 When using the D7100 as a video capture mode, the camera will display audio meter overlays over the left edge of the LCD. 
 The D7100 does not allow the lens aperture to be adjusted during video capture. 
 The slowest shutter speed in video capture mode appears to be 1/25th of a second.

Advantages and disadvantages
The sensor of the D7100 uses Nikon's DX format, resulting in a crop factor of 1.5x. Additionally the software enables an additional crop of 1.3x (resulting in approximately 1.95x compared to 35mm). Selecting this additional crop mode allows faster focusing in video mode and also enables interlaced video recording modes. This additional crop feature gives  D7100 an advantage in using tele angle lens for shooting wildlife or things at a distance. The 51-area AF system sensors covers a bigger proportion of the extra 1.3 crop factor image area, which is important for capturing high-speed moving subjects during shooting.

References

External links

 Nikon D7100 Manual Nikon
Nikon D7100 – Nikon global website
Nikon D7100 In-Depth Review DPreview
Nikon D7100 review Cameralabs

D7100
D7100
Cameras introduced in 2013